Onur Şipal (born March 17, 1989) is a Turkish amateur boxer who competed at the 2008 and 2016 Summer Olympics. He is a southpaw and competes in the welterweight division. His brother Önder Şipal is also an amateur boxer.

Career
Şipal became the 2005 Cadet World silver medalist at featherweight when he lost to Yordan Frometa 21:30.

He beat in 2007 senior world champion Yordenis Ugás in Turkey at 60 kg/lightweight (final of the Ahmet Comert International Tournament).

At the 2007 World Amateur Boxing Championships, he lost to southpaw surprise winner Frankie Gavin (boxer) from England in the quarterfinal but qualified for the Olympics in Beijing. There he lost his debut to Jose Pedraza (boxer). He won the silver medal in lightweight division at the 2010 World University Boxing Championship held in Ulan Bator, Mongolia. At the 2013 Summer Universiade in Kazan, Russia, he won the bronze medal in the welterweight division.

In 2016, prior to the Rio 2016 Olympics, Onur Şipal won a gold medal in the Eindhoven Box Cup 2016 in the Netherlands. In the quarterfinals he won against Rio qualified Arajik Marutyan (Germany) by split decision. The semi-finals he saw a unanimous win over Abdul Ibrahim (England). In the final Şipal won by split decision over the Netherlands' Delano James.

References

External links

 World cadets 2005
 Comert Cup

Living people
Lightweight boxers
1989 births
Boxers at the 2008 Summer Olympics
Olympic boxers of Turkey
Fenerbahçe boxers
Welterweight boxers
Turkish male boxers
Boxers at the 2016 Summer Olympics
Universiade medalists in boxing
Competitors at the 2018 Mediterranean Games
Mediterranean Games bronze medalists for Turkey
Mediterranean Games medalists in boxing
Universiade bronze medalists for Turkey
Medalists at the 2013 Summer Universiade
21st-century Turkish people